The Soar Valley in Leicester- and Nottinghamshire, England is the basin of the River Soar, which rises south of Leicester and flows north through Charnwood before meeting the River Trent at Trent Lock.

Soar Valley embraces the large villages of Quorn, Mountsorrel, Barrow upon Soar, Birstall, Rothley and Sileby and a number of smaller communities all on or near the River Soar as it flows from Leicester to Loughborough in Leicestershire. The area edges onto Charnwood Forest and the only double tracked preserved main railway line in Britain, the Great Central Railway forms a spine through the area.

Ward and electoral district
Downstream from Stanford on Soar the River Soar forms the boundary with Nottinghamshire and in that county Soar Valley is an electoral district for purposes of electing a councillor to Nottinghamshire County Council. The most recent election was in 2009 when Linda Sykes, of the Conservative party, won the seat. For the election of a councillor to Rushcliffe Borough Council, there is a Soar Valley ward, which covers a smaller area than the electoral district of the same name, and consists of the three parishes of Sutton Bonington, Kingston on Soar and Ratcliffe on Soar. The most recent election was in 2007 when Terry Holt, of the Liberal Democrats, won the seat.

See also
Soar Valley College

References

Valleys of Leicestershire
Valleys of Nottinghamshire
Rushcliffe